Sally Kaznica (born 13 March 1981 in Colchester) is a player for England women's national basketball team. She went to the university of Winnipeg and played on the wesmen basketball team in the year 1999 to 2004.

References

External links
http://www.gbbasketball.com/players/women/index.php?player=85182&includeref=dynamic

1981 births
Living people
English women's basketball players
Sportspeople from Colchester